Frank Pitchford (c. 1935 – January 1990) was an English professional rugby league footballer who played in the 1950s and 1960s.

Playing career

International honours
Frank Pitchford won a cap for England while at Oldham in 1955 against Other Nationalities, and won caps for Great Britain while at Oldham in 1958 against New Zealand, and in 1962 against France.

County Cup Final appearances
About Frank Pitchford's time, there was Oldham's 2-12 defeat by Barrow in the 1954 Lancashire County Cup Final during the 1954–55 season at Station Road, Swinton on Saturday 23 October 1954, the 10-3 victory over St. Helens in the 1956 Lancashire County Cup Final during the 1956–57 season at Station Road, Swinton on Saturday 20 October 1956, and the 12-2 victory over St. Helens in the 1958 Lancashire County Cup Final during the 1958–59 season at Station Road, Swinton on Saturday 25 October 1958, he played , and scored a try in Oldham's 13-8 victory over Wigan in the 1957 Lancashire County Cup Final during the 1957–58 season at Station Road, Swinton on Saturday 19 October 1957.

References

External links
(archived by web.archive.org) RUGBY LEAGUE FINAL 1963
Statistics at wigan.rlfans.com
Statistics at orl-heritagetrust.org.uk 

1930s births
1990 deaths
England national rugby league team players
English rugby league players
Great Britain national rugby league team players
Oldham R.L.F.C. players
Place of birth missing
Rugby league halfbacks
Wigan Warriors players